is a junction passenger railway station located in Urawa-ku, Saitama, Japan, operated by East Japan Railway Company (JR East). It is located near Saitama City Office and the Saitama Prefectural Government Office.

Lines
Urawa Station is served by the Tōhoku Main Line (Utsunomiya Line, Takasaki Line, Keihin-Tōhoku Line, and Shōnan-Shinjuku Lines.

Station layout

The station has three elevated island platforms, serving six tracks, with the station building underneath. The station has a "Midori no Madoguchi" staffed ticket office.

Platforms

History
Urawa Station opened on 28 July 1883 as a station of Nippon Tetsudō (lit. Japan Railway) company, when this company opened the railway from Ueno Station to Kumagaya Station (part of today's Takasaki Line). At that time, there were only six stations along the route (Urawa, and ), so Urawa Station is one of the oldest stations of the Tōhoku Main Line, and is also the oldest in the present-day city of Saitama.

Following eight years of construction, the station became fully elevated in March 2013, therefore allowing the Shōnan-Shinjuku Line to serve the station from 16 March 2013 onwards.

In 2017, chest-height platform edge doors were installed on the Keihin-Tōhoku Line platforms (1 and 2), brought into use from 21 October 2017.

Passenger statistics
In fiscal 2019, the station was used by an average of 95,865 passengers daily (boarding passengers only). 

The daily passenger figures (boarding passengers only) in previous years are as shown below.

Surrounding area 
 Saitama Prefectural Government Office
 Saitama City Office
 Isetan department store
 Corso (department store located in front of Urawa Station west exit)
 Parco Department Store
 Urawa Royal Pines Hotel
 Urawa Washington Hotel

See also
 List of railway stations in Japan

References

External links

  

Railway stations in Saitama Prefecture
Tōhoku Main Line
Takasaki Line
Keihin-Tōhoku Line
Utsunomiya Line
Stations of East Japan Railway Company
Railway stations in Saitama (city)
Railway stations in Japan opened in 1883